The Lowell School is an historic school building at 25 Lowell Street in Cambridge, Massachusetts.  Built in 1883, it is the only surviving wood-frame school building in the city.  It is a two-story structure, with a hip roof, clapboard siding, and a brick foundation.  The building has minimal decoration, with Italianate brackets in the eaves, and paired narrow windows in the Italianate style.  It was designed by local architect James Fogerty assisted by his son, George Fogerty, who both designed many public, commercial, and residential buildings in the city.

The building was listed on the National Register of Historic Places in 1982.

See also
National Register of Historic Places listings in Cambridge, Massachusetts

References

School buildings completed in 1883
School buildings on the National Register of Historic Places in Massachusetts
Buildings and structures in Cambridge, Massachusetts
National Register of Historic Places in Cambridge, Massachusetts